Sandipan is a masculine Indian name. It may refer to:

 Sandipan Chattopadhyay, Bengali writer.
 Sandipan Chanda, chess grandmaster.
 Sandipan Das, Indian cricketer.
 Sandipan Thorat, Indian politician.
 Sandipani, Hindu guru.

Indian masculine given names